Clifford Clyde Hugo (born April 23, 1951 in Glendale, California), is the bass guitarist for the art rock band Supertramp.  Hugo worked with fellow Supertramp member Carl Verheyen in the Carl Verheyen Band from  '97 - 2008 . He has toured the world as a member of the Ray Charles band. Hugo has worked as a session musician for other musical projects and artists, like Rick Braun, Melissa Manchester, Willie Bobo, Moacir Santos, Paul Williams, Richard Elliot, Dan Hicks, Chris O'Connel, Manhattan Transfer, Mel Martin, Peppino D’ Agostino and former US Navy SEAL singer songwriter harmonica player Curt Campbell’s The Eclectic Beast Band’s “Liquid Smoke” Album released in 2018.

In 2012, Hugo appeared on The Beach Boys' reunion album, That's Why God Made the Radio.

References

External links
Cliff Hugo bio on MARKBASS, the bass amp manufacturer

1951 births
Living people
American rock bass guitarists
Guitarists from California
Supertramp members
American jazz bass guitarists
American funk bass guitarists
American male bass guitarists
20th-century American bass guitarists
Jazz musicians from California
20th-century American male musicians
American male jazz musicians